Sam Kennedy (1899-?) was a Scottish association football forward who played in Scotland and the American Soccer League.

Following spells with Falkirk and Clyde in Scotland, in 1926 Kennedy signed with the Fall River Marksmen of the American Soccer League, after Fall River center forward Harold Brittan moved to the New Bedford Whalers. In December, he briefly returned to Scotland when his young son became ill. In 1927, Kennedy began the season with Fall River, played one game, then was transferred to J&P Coats. In 1928, he was again transferred during the season, this time to the New Bedford Whalers. Despite the changes in team, he scored twenty-three goals (thirteen with Coats and ten with New Bedford), placing him sixth on the goals list. In 1929, he was back with J&P Coats, now known as the Pawtucket Rangers under new ownership. He played for the Rangers until 1931.

External links

References

1899 births
American Soccer League (1921–1933) players
Clyde F.C. players
Falkirk F.C. players
Fall River Marksmen players
J&P Coats players
New Bedford Whalers players
Pawtucket Rangers players
Scottish footballers
Scottish expatriate footballers
Year of death missing
Association football forwards
Scottish expatriate sportspeople in the United States
Expatriate soccer players in the United States